Neil David Ross is a British-American voice actor and announcer. Noted for his Trans-Atlantic accent, he has provided voices in many American cartoons, most notably Voltron, G.I. Joe, and Transformers, as well as video games, including Mass Effect and Leisure Suit Larry 6 and 7.  Ross has also provided voice roles (such as radio announcers) for many movies, including Back to the Future Part II, Babe, Quiz Show, and Being John Malkovich.

Ross was the announcer for the 75th Annual Academy Awards Telecast in 2003, and the Emmy Awards Telecast in 2004. He has also narrated numerous episodes of A&E's Biography, and many editions of NOVA on PBS (including Mars – Dead or Alive, which was nominated for an Emmy Award in 2004).

Career
He started working in radio when he finished school. His first station was KMUR in Salt Lake City, Utah. Following this, he moved on to KORL, KGMB and KKUA in Honolulu, Hawaii, before moving to KCBQ in San Diego in 1969. He stayed in California, working on KYA San Francisco and KMPC Los Angeles. He made his last broadcast in 1985.

He began his voice-over work in 1978 when he moved to Los Angeles.  His first role was as a salesman in an episode of Richie Rich for Hanna-Barbera. Ross has voiced radio and television commercials for companies including Wal-Mart, AT&T, Volkswagen, Coca-Cola, Mattel, Goodyear, Disney, Hoover, Anheuser-Busch, Southwest Airlines, and Kelloggs, and has done promo works for CBS, NBC, ABC, TBS, Game Show Network and Fox Kids, using an American accent in all of his performances.

Filmography

Animation

Live action
 Press Your Luck –  Announcer / Whammy (voice)
 Superhuman Samurai Syber-Squad – Skorn ("His Master's Voice", "An Un-Helping Hand", "Loose Lips Sink Microchips"), Stupid Virus ("Cheater, Cheater, Megabyte Eater") (voices)
 The Suite Life on Deck – Narrator ("I Brake for Whales")

Movies
 Lifepod (1981) – Main Cerebral (voice)
 The Little Magician and the Big Bad Mark (1984) - (English version, voice) (as Neilson Ross)
 Cabbage Patch Kids: First Christmas (1984) - Beau Weasel / Fingers (voice)
 Explorers (1985) – (voice)
 Transformers: The Movie (1986) – Bonecrusher / Hook / Springer / Slag (voice)
 An American Tail (1986) – Honest John (voice)
 G.I. Joe: The Movie (1987) – Buzzer / Dusty / Monkeywrench / Shipwreck (voice)
 Innerspace (1987) – Pod Computer (voice)
 Little Nemo: Adventures in Slumberland (1989) – Oompa (voice)
 Back to the Future Part II (1989) – Biff Tannen Museum Narrator (voice)
 Dick Tracy (1990) – Radio Announcer #3 (voice)
 Gremlins 2: The New Batch (1990) – Announcer (voice)
 Salute to Life (1990) – Doctor
 Dragon and Slippers (1991) – Jester (voice)
 The Little Engine That Could (1991, Short) – Doc / Control Tower / Handy Pandy (voice)
 Bill & Ted's Bogus Journey (1991) – Station Twin No. 2 (voice)
 FernGully: The Last Rainforest (1992) – Elder (voice)
 The Town Santa Forgot (1993) - Pout the Elf (voice)
 Batman: Mask of the Phantasm (1993) – (voice)
 Thumbelina (1994) – Mr. Bear / Mr. Fox (voice)
 A Troll in Central Park (1994) – Pancy (voice)
 Quiz Show (1994) – Twenty-One Announcer
 The Pebble and the Penguin (1995) – Scrawny (voice)
 Babe (1995) – (voice)
 The Secret of NIMH 2: Timmy to the Rescue (1998) - Doctor Valentine's assistant
 Speedway Junky (1999) – (voice)
 Scooby-Doo! and the Witch's Ghost (1999) – Mayor Corey (voice)
 Being John Malkovich (1999) – Narrator of Malkovich biography show (voice)
 Scooby-Doo and the Alien Invaders (2000) – Sergio (voice)
 It's the Pied Piper, Charlie Brown (2000, TV Movie) – Interviewer (voice)
 Red Planet (2000) – Space Suit (voice, uncredited)
 The SpongeBob SquarePants Movie (2004) – Cyclops (voice)
 Son of the Mask (2005) – Deep Alvey Voice (voice)
 Tom and Jerry: The Fast and the Furry (2005) – Dr. Professor / Director (voice)
 The Ant Bully (2006) - Wasp #1 / Wasp #5 (voice)
 Operation: Z.E.R.O. (2006, TV Movie) – Grandfather
 Garfield Gets Real (2007) – Wally / Charles (voice)
 Dragonlance: Dragons of Autumn Twilight (2008) – Fizban / Paladine (voice)
 Garfield's Pet Force (2009) – Charles (a freakishly deerlike character that persistently shouts "Betty?!") (voice)
 The Outback (2012) – Monty (voice)
 The Reef 2: High Tide (2012) – Schliemann (voice)

Video and computer games 
 Baldur's Gate – Eldoth Kron, Ogrillon, Scar
 Call of Duty - Ending Voice
 Disney Universe – VIC
 Doom 3 – Sergeant Kelly
 Enemy Territory: Quake Wars – Stogg Nexus – AI Fax Anchor
 Eternal Darkness: Sanity's Requiem – Dr. Edwin Lindsey
 Freddy Pharkas: Frontier Pharmacist – Narrator
 Final Fantasy VII Remake – Mayor Domino
 Grand Chase - Dungeon of Monsters
 Kinetica – Crank
 Legacy of Kain – Rahab, Malek the Sarafan, King Ottmar, Elzivir the Dollmaker
 Leisure Suit Larry series – Narrator
 Mass Effect – Codex Narrator
 Mass Effect 2 – Codex Narrator
 Mass Effect 3 – Codex Narrator
 Metal Gear Solid 2: Sons of Liberty – Navy SEAL
 Metal Gear Solid 3: Snake Eater – Colonel Volgin
 Microshaft Winblows 98 - Celebrity and other voices
 Monkey Island 2 Special Edition: LeChuck's Revenge – Wally B. Feed
 The Curse of Monkey Island – Wally B. Feed
 Ninja Gaiden – Murai
 Onimusha 3 – Guildenstern
 Onimusha Blade Warriors – Guildenstern
 RAGE 2 – Dr. Kvasir, Legs, Wellspring Guard
 Return to Castle Wolfenstein – Higgs, Nazi Soldier No. 2
 Return to Monkey Island – Wally B. Feed
 Revenant (video game) – Sardok, Verhoevan, Townsmen 
 Rosewater (video game) - Doc Sedgwick, Oberlin, Quentin Ellis, Perry Cloud Smith, Buford, Roderick Nethersole
 Spyro: Year of the Dragon – Moneybags, Bentley
 Spyro: Enter the Dragonfly – Moneybags, Additional characters
 Spider-Man 3 – Luke Carlyle/Mad Bomber
 Star Trek: Elite Force II – Stemmons
 Star Wars: Galactic Battlegrounds – Han Solo
 Star Wars: X-Wing vs. TIE Fighter
 Star Wars: Rogue Squadron – Narrator, Han Solo, General Rieekan, Moff Kohl Seerdon, narrator
 Star Wars: Masters of Teräs Käsi – Han Solo, Jodo Kast
 Star Wars: Rebellion – Han Solo, Stormtrooper, Imperial Command Center Communications Officer
 Star Wars: X-Wing Alliance – Admiral Nammo, Concourse PA Announcer, Imperial Officer, Rebel Pilot
 Star Wars: Force Commander – Han Solo, TR-SD Driver, Ruulian Computer Worker
 Star Wars: Starfighter – Trade Federation Officer, Rescue 3, Wingman
 Star Wars: Jedi Starfighter – Wingmate 2
 Star Wars: Knights of the Old Republic – Additional Voices
 Summoner 2 – Krobelus, Pirate Medevan Leader, Sharangir
 The Bard's Tale – Additional voices
 Vampire: The Masquerade – Bloodlines – additional voices
 Wolfenstein: Enemy Territory – Axis Commander

References

External links 

 Neil Ross Voiceovers – official website
 Voice demos
 
 
 Neil Ross interview
 Neil Ross interview on Insomniac Mania

Living people
20th-century American male actors
20th-century British male actors
20th-century English male actors
21st-century American male actors
21st-century British male actors
21st-century English male actors
American male video game actors
American male voice actors
American radio personalities
British emigrants to the United States
British radio personalities
British male video game actors
British male voice actors
English emigrants to the United States
English male video game actors
English male voice actors
English radio personalities
Game show announcers
Year of birth missing (living people)